The state of Florida in the United States is a popular location for the filming and setting of movies and television shows, both fictional and non-fictional. The following article provides a list of films and television shows which have been partially or wholly set in or shot in Florida. The listed shows span a wide variety of genres and range from shows almost entirely shot and set in one city (e.g., Miami for The Golden Girls and Miami Vice) to those containing only a small number of scenes shot or set in Florida (e.g., Lost and Moonraker.

Films set in or shot in Miami

References 

 
Florida